= Internet Saathi =

Progamme

Internet Saathi is a programme to improve digital literacy among women in rural areas in India, in order bring them online. The programme is a joint initiative of Google India, Intel and Tata Trusts. The programme aims to train Saathis (friend, fem. in Hindi) in villages that can in turn help educate other women from their village in the use of the internet.

== History ==
Data from the Internet and Mobile Association of India showed that of the countries internet users, only 18 percent were from rural areas in 2015. Among those 18 percent, only one in ten were women, making up only 1.8 percent of India's total internet users.

The Internet Saathi programme was started in July 2015 with a pilot programme of 5,000 rural villages in Rajasthan.

In February 2018 the programme was expanded to Tamil Nadu.

== Results ==
In August 2017, Forbes reported that 17 million women in rural areas, across in 170,000 villages have benefited from the programme.
